Scandalo is the Italian word for scandal. It may also refer to:

Scandalo album by Gianna Nannini
Scandalo or Submission, 1976 film